The 2019 Southeastern Louisiana Lions football team represents Southeastern Louisiana University in the 2019 NCAA Division I FCS football season. The Lions are led by second-year head coach Frank Scelfo and play their home games at Strawberry Stadium. They are a member of the Southland Conference.

Previous season
The Lions finished the 2018 season 4–7, 4–5 in Southland play to finish in a tie for eighth place.

Preseason

Preseason poll
The Southland Conference released their preseason poll on July 18, 2019. The Lions were picked to finish in eighth place.

Preseason All–Southland Teams
The Lions placed five different players on the preseason all–Southland teams.

Offense

1st team

Bransen Schwebel – TE/HB

Juwan Petit-Frere – WR

Defense

1st team

Juwan Petit-Frere – KR

Devonte Williams – PR

2nd team

Isaac Adeyemi-Berglund – DL

Austin Mitchell – PR

Roster

Schedule

Source:

Game summaries

Jacksonville State

at Ole Miss

Lamar

at Northwestern State

at McNeese State

Incarnate Word

at Houston Baptist

Stephen F. Austin

at Central Arkansas

at Abilene Christian

Nicholls

FCS Playoffs
The Lions were selected for the postseason tournament, with a first-round pairing against Villanova.

Villanova (first round)

at Montana (second round)

Rankings

References

Southeastern Louisiana
Southeastern Louisiana Lions football seasons
Southeastern Louisiana
Southeastern Louisiana Lions football